The Housing Development Bank of Mekong Delta or Mekong Housing Bank (MHB) was a Vietnamese commercial bank operated from 1997 to 2015. At its peak, the bank employed more than 5,000 employees and had 44 branches and 187 sub-branches. 

In 2015, the bank merged with Bank for Investment and Development of Vietnam (BIDV), ending its operation.

Banks of Vietnam
1997 establishments in Vietnam